Ihor Reptyukh (born 18 June 1994) is a Ukrainian male cross-country skier and biathlete. He has represented Ukraine at the Paralympics in 2014 and 2018 claiming 4 medals in his Paralympic career including a gold medal which he claimed during the 2018 Winter Paralympics.

Career 
Ihor Reptyukh made his Paralympic debut during the 2014 Winter Paralympics and claimed a solitary silver medal in the 4 x 2.5 km relay open event.

Ihor claimed his first Paralympic gold medal during the 2018 Winter Paralympics after clinching a gold medal in the 20km free standing event. He also achieved his first Paralympic medal for biathlon in his career, after claiming a bronze medal in the men's 7.5km standing event and followed it up with a silver medal in the men's 12.5km standing event.

References

External links 
 

1994 births
Living people
Ukrainian male cross-country skiers
Ukrainian male biathletes
Paralympic cross-country skiers of Ukraine
Paralympic biathletes of Ukraine
Paralympic gold medalists for Ukraine
Paralympic silver medalists for Ukraine
Paralympic bronze medalists for Ukraine
Cross-country skiers at the 2014 Winter Paralympics
Cross-country skiers at the 2018 Winter Paralympics
Biathletes at the 2014 Winter Paralympics
Biathletes at the 2018 Winter Paralympics
Medalists at the 2014 Winter Paralympics
Medalists at the 2018 Winter Paralympics
Sportspeople from Chernihiv
Paralympic medalists in cross-country skiing
Paralympic medalists in biathlon
21st-century Ukrainian people